Lesotho competed in the 2014 Commonwealth Games in Glasgow, Scotland from 23 July – 3 August 2014.

Athletics

Men
Track & road events

Women
Track & road events

Field events

Key
Note–Ranks given for track events are within the athlete's heat only
Q = Qualified for the next round
q = Qualified for the next round as a fastest loser or, in field events, by position without achieving the qualifying target
NR = National record
N/A = Round not applicable for the event

Boxing

Men

Women

Cycling

Mountain biking

Road
Men

Squash

Individual

Swimming

Men

Table Tennis

Singles

Doubles

References

Nations at the 2014 Commonwealth Games
Lesotho at the Commonwealth Games
2014 in Lesotho sport